MK4 may refer to:

Mortal Kombat 4, video game
Menatetrenone, vitamin K2
Mario Kart: Double Dash, the fourth game in the Mario Kart series, released in 2003 for the Nintendo GameCube